Ebrahim Taghipour (born September 23, 1976 in Sari, Iran) is a retired Iranian football player who previously played for Zob Ahan, Persepolis, Esteghlal and also Iran national football team.

Honours
Zob Ahan
Iranian Hazfi Cup (1): 2002–03

Esteghlal
Iran's Premier Football League (1): 2008–09

References

Iranian footballers
Iran international footballers
Association football defenders
Zob Ahan Esfahan F.C. players
Persepolis F.C. players
Esteghlal Ahvaz players
Sanat Mes Kerman F.C. players
Pegah Gilan players
Esteghlal F.C. players
Saba players
Nassaji Mazandaran players
2004 AFC Asian Cup players
People from Sari, Iran
1976 births
Living people
Sanat Sari players
Sportspeople from Sari, Iran